Juan Carlos Ferrero defeated Gustavo Kuerten in the final, 3–6, 6–1, 2–6, 6–4, 6–2 to win the men's singles tennis title at the 2001 Italian Open.

Magnus Norman was the defending champion, but lost in the first round to Vincenzo Santopadre.

Seeds

  Gustavo Kuerten (final)
  Marat Safin (second round)
  Andre Agassi (first round)
  Pete Sampras (first round)
  Magnus Norman (first round)
  Yevgeny Kafelnikov (second round)
  Lleyton Hewitt (third round)
  Juan Carlos Ferrero (champion)
  Tim Henman (second round)
  Àlex Corretja (quarterfinals)
  Arnaud Clément (first round)
  Sébastien Grosjean (third round)
  Thomas Enqvist (second round)
  Jan-Michael Gambill (first round)
  Franco Squillari (third round)
  Dominik Hrbatý (first round)

Draw

Finals

Top half

Section 1

Section 2

Bottom half

Section 3

Section 4

External links
 2001 Rome Masters draw

Men's Singles
Italian Open - Singles